Context-sensitive help is a kind of online help that is obtained from a specific point in the state of the software, providing help for the situation that is associated with that state.

Context-sensitive help, as opposed to general online help or online manuals, does not need to be accessible for reading as a whole. Each topic is supposed to describe extensively one state, situation, or feature of the software.

Context-sensitive help can be implemented using tooltips, which either provide a terse description of a GUI widget or display a complete topic from the help file. Other commonly used ways to access context-sensitive help start by clicking a button. One way uses a per widget button that displays the help immediately. Another way changes the pointer shape to a question mark, and then, after the user clicks a widget, the help appears.

Context-sensitive help is most used in, but is not limited to, GUI environments. Examples include Apple's System 7 Balloon help, Microsoft's WinHelp, OS/2's INF Help or Sun's JavaHelp.  An example of context sensitive help familiar to most Wikipedia users are the tooltips that show previews of links within articles, helping readers to determine whether following the link is valuable prior to shifting pages.

A similar topic is embedded help, which can be thought of as a "deeper" context-sensitive help. It generally goes beyond basic explanations or manual clicks by either detecting a user's need for help or offering a guided explanation in situ. Embedded help is not to be confused with a software wizard.

See also 
Balloon Help
Tooltip
AnswerDash

Notes

References 

Describes the connection between where the help is needed and how the help is provided.

Online help